James Warner may refer to:

 James Warner (aviator) (1891–1970), radio operator on the 1928 trans-Pacific flight of the Southern Cross
 James Warner (surveyor)  (1814–1891), pioneer surveyor in Queensland, Australia
 James D. Warner (died 2009), bishop of the Episcopal Diocese of Nebraska
 James M. Warner (1836–1897), American Civil War general
 Jim Warner (born 1954), retired ice hockey forward
 Jimmy Warner (1865–1943), English footballer

See also
 James Warner Bellah (1899–1976), author